Helena, Michigan may refer to:

Helena, Huron County, Michigan
Helena, Marquette County, Michigan
Helena Township, Michigan, in Antrim County